Renton Technical College (Renton Tech or RTC) is a public community college in Renton, Washington. The college offers bachelor's degrees, associate degrees and certificates of completion in professional-technical fields.

History
In 1941, Renton Technical College came into existence as a war production school. Throughout the duration of World War II, the college provided customized pre-employment training and job upgrading-retraining.

After the war, the college became a state-funded vocational school with the mission of assisting industry in converting from a war-time to a peace-time economy. For the next 20 years, the college conducted a large number of upgrading-retraining classes and a small number of high quality training programs.

In 1965, the college moved to a central campus comprising three new buildings. For the next five years, the basis of the specialized College was laid with its emphasis on open-entry, open-exit, and continuous progress instruction based on achievement of measurable competencies.

Since 1971, the college has grown to nearly 400,000 square feet and the student body has increased 500 percent. The original three buildings have been remodeled and expanded, 10 new structures have been built, four portables have been added, and the college has acquired numerous off-campus facilities. The growth of the central campus has enabled the college to improve and expand training in the growing industries of health, service, and information technology – especially those fields that are affected by new technologies. The college continues to provide customized training and services to Puget Sound-area businesses.

The second 50 years, beginning in 1991, were marked by the conversion of the state's vocational-technical institutes to technical colleges. As part of this change, governance was shifted to the State Board for Community and Technical Colleges and authorization was given to grant two year, sub-baccalaureate degrees and certificates of completion. Degrees are awarded in 36 preparatory programs, in apprenticeship and through three general occupational degree programs. Certificates are currently provided in 80 programs.

Academics
The college has full-time and part-time professional-technical programs that are divided into areas of study:
Automotive
Business Technology
Construction and Building Technology 
Culinary Careers
Education and Human Services
(Allied) Health Careers
Manufacturing and Product Service Technology
Technology
Ford ASSET Program

The college also offers General Education courses necessary to complete the associate's degree requirements.

Accreditation
Renton Technical College is accredited by the Northwest Commission on Colleges and Universities (NWCCU)

References

External links
Official website

Universities and colleges in Renton, Washington
Community colleges in Washington (state)
Two-year colleges in the United States
Universities and colleges accredited by the Northwest Commission on Colleges and Universities
Educational institutions established in 1942
Technological universities in the United States
Vocational education in the United States
Seattle metropolitan area
1942 establishments in Washington (state)